Botrodus estriatus is a species of beetles from the family Murmidiidae. The scientific name of this species was first published in 1890 by Casey.

References

Coccinelloidea

Beetles described in 1890